The statue of Heydar Aliyev is a bronze sculpture of the third president of Azerbaijan, Heydar Aliyev, previously installed along Paseo de la Reforma, in Chapultepec, Miguel Hidalgo, Mexico City.

In the early 2010s, the embassy of Azerbaijan in Mexico donated two statues to the city: the first being the statue of Aliyev, installed on 22 August 2012 in Mexico-Azerbaijan Friendship Park in  Chapultepec; the second, a woman mourning the Khojaly massacre, was placed in Tlaxcoaque Plaza, in the historic center of the city. According to Ilgar Mukhtarov, Azerbaijan Ambassador to Mexico, both statues were given to the country to show appreciation for being one of the first to recognize the independence of Azerbaijan.

After its installation, the statue of Aliyev received protests from neighbors and human rights activists, who called it "disrespectful and insensitive" due to his controversial political background; the Azeri community, however, supported the installation. On 26 January 2013, the government of Mexico City removed the statue and returned it to the embassy. Since then, the location and status of the statue are not publicly known.

Background

Heydar Aliyev was an Azerbaijani politician. From 1969 to 1982, he was the First Secretary of the Communist Party of Azerbaijan. In 1992, Abulfaz Elchibey was elected president, becoming the country's first non-communist leader. However, after a coup d'état the following year, Elchibey was overthrown. Aliyev, founder and then-leader of the New Azerbaijan Party, took position as acting president, and months later he was officially elected as president of Azerbaijan. Aliyev was re-elected in 1998 and died in 2003.

Although Heydarism became significant for the national politics and Azeri society, Aliyev has been criticized internationally, being described as an "iron fist" leader, "dictator", and "authoritarian".

In December 1991, Mexico recognized the independence of Azerbaijan after the dissolution of the Soviet Union, and diplomatic relations were established the following month. In 2009, Azerbaijan established diplomatic missions on Mexican soil. In 2011, the Mexican Senate recognized the 1992 Khojaly massacre, where ethnic Azerbaijani civilians were killed in Khojaly, in the de facto independent Republic of Artsakh, by Armenian forces.

Description and installation
According to Ilgar Mukhtarov, Azerbaijan Ambassador to Mexico, negotiations for the project began in 2008, but it was not until 2010 that they were materialized. He also said the project was a way to show appreciation to Mexico for being one of the first countries to recognize the independence of Azerbaijan. On 13 July 2011, both nations signed an agreement to start a project. In the same month, it was endorsed by the Citizens' Governing Council of Chapultepec Park (CRC).

The accorded space was named "Mexico-Azerbaijan Friendship Park", located along Paseo de la Reforma, at the edge of Chapultepec, the area measures , illuminated with solar street lights. Construction began in April 2012. The statue was donated by the embassy of Azerbaijan in Mexico, measures 3.60 meters (around ), and was transported by ship from Azerbaijan.

On 22 August 2012, Marcelo Ebrard, then-head of government of Mexico City, inaugurated the project. Tracy Wilkinson of Los Angeles Times described the memorial as "Aliyev [sitting] on a white marble pedestal [with] his name embossed in golden letters" and placed "in front of a jagged stone map of Azerbaijan"; the latter is almost eight meters high (up to ). Also, Will Grant of BBC News described a plaque calling Aliyev "a great politician and statesman".

Khojaly massacre memorial

Additionally, the embassy donated a second statue. The statue was installed in the Tlaxcoaque Plaza, in the historic center of Mexico City. The plaque initially called the Khojaly massacre a "genocide", but this was later changed to "massacre". The embassy also donated around 65 million Mexican pesos (around five to six million US dollars) which were used to improve Friendship Park and Tlaxcoaque Plaza. According to Mukhtarov, the embassy never gave money directly to the city but paid private construction companies for the improvement of the areas.

Reception

By November 2011, after researching Aliyev further, the CRC withdrew their endorsement and requested that the government of the city reconsider the installation of the statue. According to Denise Dresser, Mexican writer and former member of the CRC, "[after requesting them to reconsider it,] they thought we were making a mountain out of a molehill [...] They were clueless and they were ignorant, and we alerted them to the fact that they were clueless and ignorant."

Controversy started by early September 2012. On 27 September, Chapultepec neighbors protested the installation, calling the statue "disrespectful and insensitive". The National Human Rights Commission recommended its removal. Elnur Majidli, organizer of the 2011 Azerbaijani protests, criticized the installation, saying that corruption was involved "necessarily" in the project. Cuauhtémoc Cárdenas, working as Mexico City's international affairs coordinator, said that "The statue of Mr. Aliyev does not honor Mexico City, and Mexico City does not have any reason to honor him".

In October, Eduard Nalbandyan, then-Ministry of Foreign Affairs of Armenia, complained to Patricia Espinosa, then-Secretary of Foreign Affairs of Mexico, about the statue of Aliyev and the classification of the Khojaly massacre as "genocide" against the position taken by the OSCE Minsk Group. Armenia and Azerbaijan have been in a geopolitical conflict over Nagorno-Karabakh since the 1917 October Revolution and they have no diplomatic relations.

Mukhtarov said the information concerning Aliyev was "erroneous and manipulated by the Armenian opposition", as Aliyev "abolished capital punishment and promoted policies that improved Azerbaijan's economy". On 27 November 2012, 30 Azeri protestors based in Mexico requested the statue to be kept.

Removal

On 22 October, to determine the future of the statue, a special commission was created. In January 2013, the group recommended its removal. Five months after its installation, the sculpture was removed by Mexico City authorities during the early morning of 26 January. The city had previously signed an agreement to keep the statue in place for 99 years. It was transported to a warehouse of the Urban Development and Housing Secretariat, located at Camarones Avenue and Eloudy Street, colonia (Mexican Spanish for "neighborhood") of Del Recreo in the Azcapotzalco borough. Joshua Kucera described the place as "strewn with debris and stacks of bricks", calling it an "ignominious fate" for Aliyev.

Manuel Luna, private secretary of Mukhtarov, said the embassy of Azerbaijan was never notified about the removal. The embassy asked the city government to give them back the statue. Salvador Campos, former Mexican ambassador to Azerbaijan and Turkey, considered the problem was that the government of Mexico City never consulted the Secretary of Foreign Affairs. As a consequence, Azerbaijan withdrew 3.8 billion US dollars of investment that would be used for building oil refineries and for improving public spaces in Mexico.

As of November 2013, the statue was placed in a private home in the colonia of Lomas de Chapultepec. In January 2015, the government of Mexico City donated to the embassy of Azerbaijan a property along Paseo de la Reforma in Lomas de Chapultepec. On account of the controversy, the Committee for Monuments and Artistic Works in Public Spaces (Comité de Monumentos y Obras Artísticas en Espacios Públicos, COMAEP) was created to avoid similar incidents in the city.

Notes

References

2012 establishments in Mexico
2012 sculptures
2013 disestablishments in Mexico
Azerbaijan–Mexico relations
Bronze sculptures in Mexico
Heydar Aliyev
Monuments and memorials in Mexico City
Outdoor sculptures in Mexico City
Paseo de la Reforma
Relocated buildings and structures
Removed statues
Sculptures of men in Mexico
Statues in Mexico City
Statues of presidents